The Lviv Physics and Mathematics Lyceum (also known as LPML) is a public boarding high school in Lviv, Ukraine. It is considered to be one of the best educational institutions in the country. In 2012 and 2015, the Lviv Physics and Mathematics Lyceum was ranked first among high schools in Ukraine by Focus magazine. The school is well known for organizing multiple country-wide competitions in mathematics, physics ("Levenia"), programming ("Bober"), and the Ukrainian version of the international Mathematical Kangaroo contest.

General
The Lviv Physics and Mathematics Lyceum offers two programs: Physics/Mathematics (grades 8 - 11) and Chemistry/Biology (grades 9 - 11). In the past, a third concentration, combining mathematics and geography, was also available. This concentration is no longer offered due to insufficient enrolments.

Students of the lyceum are frequently among the top participants at the National Olympiads. LPML students often represent Ukraine at various International Olympiads, including Physics (IPhO), Mathematics (IMO), and Chemistry (IChO).

Application
Those who wish to study at the LPML have to pass an entry exam, with top performers offered admission. Students who previously won regional Olympiads are offered early admission without writing the entrance exam. The average annual enrolment ranges from 110 to 130 students with around 30 students per class.

Student life
Residents from out of town stay in gender-based dormitories. Nearly 25% of all LPML students reside in these dormitories.

See also 
Ukrainian Physics and Mathematics Lyceum

References

Schools in Ukraine
Education in Lviv
Buildings and structures in Lviv
Secondary schools in Ukraine